The 1987 Men's Hockey Champions Trophy was the ninth edition of the Hockey Champions Trophy for men. The tournament was held from 19–28 June 1987, in Amstelveen, Netherlands. 

West Germany won the tournament for the second time. Netherlands and Australia finished in second and third place, respectively.

Participating nations

Results

Pool standings

Matches

References

C
C
1987
Champions Trophy (field hockey)